Holzkape is a river of Hesse, Germany. It flows into the Esse near Grebenstein.

See also
List of rivers of Hesse

Rivers of Hesse
Rivers of Germany